CST3 may refer to: 

 Cystatin 3, a serum protein used as a marker of kidney function
 Montréal/St-Lazare Airport